David A. Coulter is an American banker.

Currently he is managing director and senior advisor of Warburg Pincus, a global private equity firm. Prior to joining Warburg Pincus, he was vice chairman of JPMorgan Chase & Co. (financial services and retail banking) from January 2001 to September 2005. Prior to the merger with J.P. Morgan & Co. Incorporated, he was vice chairman of The Chase Manhattan Corporation (bank holding company) from August 2000 to December 2000. He was a partner in the Beacon Group, L.P. (investment banking firm) from January 2000 to July 2000, and was chairman and chief executive officer of Bank of America Corporation and Bank of America NT&SA from May 1996 to October 1998. Coulter has been a director of PG&E Corporation and Pacific Gas and Electric Company since 1996. He also is a director of Metavante Technologies and Strayer Education, Inc.

Born in Ford City, Pennsylvania, he was educated at Carnegie Mellon University. In April 2021, he was announced as the Chair of the Board of Trustees of Carnegie Mellon.

Sources

1949 births
Living people
People from Ford City, Pennsylvania
Carnegie Mellon University alumni
Private equity and venture capital investors
JPMorgan Chase people